GRB 130427A was a record-setting gamma-ray burst, discovered starting on April 27, 2013. This GRB was associated to SN 2013cq, of which the appearance of optical signal was predicted on May 2, 2013 and detected on May 13, 2013. The Fermi space observatory detected a gamma-ray with an energy of at least 94 billion electron volts.  It was simultaneously detected by the Burst Alert Telescope aboard the Swift telescope and was the brightest burst Swift had ever detected. It was one of the five closest GRBs, at about 3.6 billion light-years away, and was comparatively long-lasting.

Swift space observatory also observed the burst, quickly determining its location. The X-ray afterglow of the burst was so bright that Swift was able to observe it for the next six months.

The emission was also detected using radio, infrared and visible radiation from ground-based telescopes using the sky location from Swift. The burst was observed with a 350mm optical telescope and its brightness measured. The visible apparent magnitude decreased from 13 to 15.5 over a three-hour period starting at 08:05:12 UTC 27 April 2013.  The Catalina Real-time Transient Survey also detected the burst optically, independent of the alert. It received designation CSS130502:113233+274156.  It was found at right ascension 11:32:32.90, and declination +27:41:56.5 (J2000).
The SDSS catalogue shows a galaxy (SDSS J113232.84+274155.4) almost coincident with this position at magnitude r=21.26 but with no SDSS spectrum obtained.

References

130427A
20130427
April 2013 events
Leo (constellation)